"Urvasi Urvasi" is an Indian Tamil-language song composed by A. R. Rahman and written by Vairamuthu for the soundtrack of the 1994 film Kadhalan. The song features vocals by Suresh Peters, Shahul Hameed and A. R. Rahman himself. "Urvasi" was the first song composed for the film. The song was a chartbuster in contemporary Tamil music, and became one of the most popular songs of all time. The Hindi version of the song was similarly successful across India.

Other versions
The song was later dubbed into Telugu and Hindi. The Hindi version of the Kadhalan soundtrack, called Humse Hai Muqabala, sold 2.5 million units in India, with "Urvasi" being one of its most popular tracks. It inspired the title of Rajsirpy's 1996 film Take It Easy Urvasi

In 2014, American hip hop recording artist will.i.am and singer Cody Wise, re-created "Urvasi Urvasi" as It's My Birthday. It's My Birthday topped the charts in the United Kingdom, becoming will.i.am's tenth chart-topper there (including five as a member of The Black Eyed Peas). In 2016, this song was featured in the Australian movie Lion.

Yo Yo Honey Singh released a cover version called "Urvashi" in 2018. It was also re-used in online pharmacy application named pharmEasy's commercial.

See also
Kadhalan (soundtrack)

References

1994 songs
Indian songs
Songs written for films
Tamil-language songs
Tamil film songs
Songs with music by A. R. Rahman
Songs with lyrics by Vaali (poet)